"You and I Both" is a song by American musician Jason Mraz, released as the second single from his debut album, Waiting for My Rocket to Come (2002), on June 16, 2003.

Music video
The video begins with Mraz in a bank, waiting in line to deposit the coins in his piggy bank. He sees the teller (Lizzy Caplan of CBS's The Class, Mean Girls, and Cloverfield) and instantly falls in love with her. He tries several times to get her as his teller and fails miserably on all counts, first spilling the coins from his piggy bank, then cutting in line only to have her close her window just as he gets to it. After multiple attempts, Mraz finally manages to reach the teller and passes a note reading, "Give me what I want "

The bank's manager walks over and, thinking the note signals an attempted robbery, pushes the alarm button. Security lights flash and papers begin to fly around the bank, while the customers and staff begin to dance. The police arrive and they too join the dance before escorting Mraz out in handcuffs, slamming him against the hood of the police car. The teller comes running out of the bank and watches him being taken away.

Now sharing a jail cell, a bereft Mraz doodles on the walls and pines away the hours. Ultimately, he returns to the bank to find the teller. He looks in the window and doesn't see her, but turns around to find she has pulled up in a car behind him. He gets in and they drive away together, and the video ends with heart frame around the car as it drives away, the words "The End" flashing across the screen.

Track listing
Australian CD single
 "You and I Both" (album version)
 "Common Pleasure" (live)
 "You and I Both" (live)
 "Rainbow Connection" (live video)

Credits and personnel
Credits are lifted from the Waiting for My Rocket to Come album booklet.

Studios
 Mixed at The Crabtrap (Easton, Maryland)
 Engineered at Dragonfly Studios (Haymarket, Virginia) and The Crabtrap (Easton, Maryland)
 Mastered at Sterling Sound (New York City)

Personnel

 Jason Mraz – music, lyrics, vocals, acoustic guitar
 Michael Andrews – electric guitars, acoustic slide guitar
 Stewart Myers – bass guitar
 John Alagia – B3, shaker, tambourine
 Brian Jones – drums
 John Alagía – production, mixing
 Chris Keup – preproduction, arrangement assistance
 Jeff Juliano – mixing, engineering
 Peter Harding – second engineer
 Ted Jensen – mastering

Charts

Certifications

Release history

Covers
The song was covered by Dean Saunders, winner of the third season of Popstars Netherlands. The song was released as his debut solo single and reached number four on the Dutch Top 40.

References

2002 songs
2003 singles
Elektra Records singles
Jason Mraz songs
Songs written by Jason Mraz
Warner Music Australasia singles